Hyppa xylinoides, known generally as the common hyppa or cranberry cutworm, is a species of cutworm or dart moth in the family Noctuidae. It is found in North America.

The MONA or Hodges number for Hyppa xylinoides is 9578.

References

Further reading

 
 
 
 
 
 
 
 
 

Xylenini
Articles created by Qbugbot
Moths described in 1852